Territorial Assembly elections were held in Senegal on 31 March 1957. The result was a landslide victory for the Senegalese Popular Bloc (BPS), which won 47 of the 60 seats. Its main competitor, the MSA-affiliated Senegalese Party of Socialist Action (PSAS) had aliented the marabouts and enabled the BPS to win the rural vote (over which the marabouts held an important sway) by far.

Electoral system
The elections had been called after the adoption of the Loi Cadre in 1956, which instituted a system of semiautonomous governments in the different colonies of French West Africa.

Campaign
Whilst most other Territorial Assembly elections were dominated by affiliates of the African Democratic Rally (RDA), the Senegalese elections saw a clash between the Senegalese parties affiliated to the African Convention (CA) and the African Socialist Movement (MSA) respectively.

The CA-affiliated BPS had evolved out of the Senegalese Democratic Bloc just before the elections. In the run-up to the elections the BPS leader Léopold Sédar Senghor had a more socialist and nationalist discourse, attracting various trade unionists and leftwing intellectuals to join the BPS leadership.

Results
One MP from Kédougou was elected from one of the various regional lists that contested the polls. No women were elected to the assembly.

Aftermath
After the elections, BPS selected Ibrahima Seydou N'Daw from Kaolack as the chair of the Assembly.

References

Elections in Senegal
Senegal
1957 in Senegal